is a Japanese luger who has competed since 1996. Competing in three Winter Olympics, he earned his best finish of 16th in the men's singles event at Nagano in 1998.

Ushijima's best finish at the FIL World Luge Championships was 21st in the men's singles event twice (2004, 2007).

References
 
 
 1998 luge men's singles results
 2002 luge men's singles results
 2006 luge men's singles results

External links
 

1977 births
Living people
Japanese male lugers
Olympic lugers of Japan
Lugers at the 1998 Winter Olympics
Lugers at the 2002 Winter Olympics
Lugers at the 2006 Winter Olympics